= Kouachi =

Kouachi (Arabic: كواشي) is an Arabic surname. Notable people with the surname include:

- Chérif Kouachi (born 1982), mass murderer of Charlie Hebdo infamy
- Saïd Kouachi (born 1980), other mass murderer of Charlie Hebdo infamy
